Ma'an is one of the governorates of Jordan, it is located south of Amman, Jordan's capital. Its capital is the city of Ma'an. This governorate is the largest in the kingdom of Jordan by area.

History

The land of the Governorate of Ma'an hosts many historic sites. The land of Ma'an Governorate was under the Edomite rule, which had its capital in Busaira in neighboring Tafilah Governorate. The Edomites were then replaced by the Nabateans who built one of the most significant archaeological and historical sites in the Middle East, the ancient city of Petra. After succeeding in repulsing Macedonian and Roman invasions, Petra finally fell to the Roman Empire in 103 A.D. Near Petra is Jebel Harun or Jebel Nebi Harun (lit. 'Mountain of Prophet Aaron'), a strong candidate for biblical Mount Hor where Aaron, the brother of Moses, died and was buried. There is a mosque at the top of the mountain, built at the traditional site of Aaron's tomb.

Evidence for human settlement in Ma'an Governorate dates back to at least , when the Neolithic village of Basta was founded. Basta was one of the first settlements in the world to have agriculture and domesticated livestock.

In the 7th century A.D. the lands of Ma'an were annexed to the Islamic Khaliphate. With the coming of the Crusaders in the 11th century, The Crusaders took control of the highlands of Shoubak, at an elevation of more than 1300 meters above sea level,  the Crusaders built the castle of Montreal in the city of Shoubak.

Ma'an was the capital of the Arab state declared by Emir Abdullah for a short period of time in 1920 before moving the capital to Amman. The first newspaper in the modern day Jordan was issued in Ma'an and was named Alhaqqu Ya'lu (الحق يعلو ).

In Autumn 1996 and Spring 1997 the Al-Jafr-desert, located near Al-Jafr in the eastern part of the governorate, was the location of extensive tests of the ThrustSSC, the British-built currently fastest land vehicle in the world, which was the first land vehicle to break the sound barrier in October 1997 in the Black Rock Desert, Nevada, United States. The ThrustSSC was thus therefore the fastest land vehicle ever driven in an Arab country.

Geography
Although Ma'an Governorate has the largest area of the 12 governorates that constitute the Kingdom of Jordan, it has the lowest population density: less than 4 persons per square km. It has international borders with Saudi Arabia from the east and south, and borders Aqaba, Tafilah, and Karak governorates from the west, and Amman Governorate from the north.
 
The climate in Ma'an is mostly desert climate, but the western highlands have a Mediterranean climate. The average annual rainfall ranges from 50 mm in the desert regions to 250 mm in the western highlands, and exceeds 500 mm in the Sharah mountains.

Demographics
The population of districts according to census results:

Administrative divisions
The ministry of Interior divides Ma'an Governorate into four departments under Article 7 of the Administrative Divisions System of the year 2000. The capital department is further subdivided into five subdivisions:

Gallery

References

External links
Photos of Ma'an at the American Center of Research
Photos of Ma'an Fort - Ma'an at the American Center of Research

 
Governorates of Jordan